The Central Connecticut–Hartford rivalry refers to the American collegiate athletics rivalry between the Central Connecticut Blue Devils sports teams of Central Connecticut State University and Hartford Hawks sports teams of the University of Hartford. The two campuses are located 10 miles apart. Unlike most in-state rivalries Hartford and Central Connecticut compete in difference conferences. Hartford competes in the America East Conference and Central Connecticut competes in the Northeast Conference. On May 6, 2021 the University of Hartford board of regents voted to transition the university’s athletic program from Division I to Division III, putting the future of the rivalry in doubt.

Basketball

The two schools starting playing each other as division II rivals in 1958. After the 2002 edition the series went on hiatus until 2010 when both schools competed against each other in the Connecticut 6 tournament held at Mohegan Sun Arena.  During the break in the series Central Connecticut became a power in the Northeast Conference under head coach Howie Dickenman making the NCAA tournament in 2000, 2002, and 2007. 

Traditionally the game is played at the beginning of every season. In the 2017 matchup Central's head coach Donyell Marshall and assistant coach Anthony Anderson were both suspended for the game due to an altercation at practice, assistant coaches Mike Witcoskie and Anthony Ross handled the coaching duties for the Hartford game.

Basketball series record

Baseball 
Central Connecticut and Hartford first played each other in baseball in 1985. Central started to dominate the series in the early part of the millennium, with its teams making multiple trips to the NCAA tournament. In 2010 CCSU completed construction of Balf–Savin Field on campus, their first game in the new stadium was a 12-11 loss to Hartford. Starting in 2018, Central Connecticut and Hartford played against each other at Dunkin' Donuts Park in downtown Hartford in March and in May. The two schools played again at Dunkin' Donuts Park in May 2019. In 2020 the series will be moved back to campus with Central Connecticut hosting a single game in March.

Baseball series record

References 

 

Central Connecticut Blue Devils men's basketball
Hartford Hawks men's basketball
College sports rivalries in the United States
College baseball rivalries in the United States
College basketball rivalries in the United States
1958 establishments in Connecticut